Leptuca leptodactyla, commonly known as the thin-fingered fiddler crab or the western Atlantic fiddler crab, is a species of fiddler crab native to the western Atlantic coast of the Americas.

Taxonomy

Previously a member of the genus Uca, the species was transferred in 2016 to the genus Leptuca when Leptuca was promoted from subgenus to genus level.

Description
The carapace can be up to 13mm wide.

Distribution
The range of the crab includes southern Florida, Mexico, the West Indies, Venezuela, and Brazil. Within Brazil, the crab is present along the coast between the states of Maranhão and Santa Catarina.

Habitat
The species lives in brackish and saline environments, including mangrove stands and intertidal sand flats. It prefers sandy substrate.

References

Ocypodoidea
Crustaceans described in 1898